The Northern Kentucky Nightmare was a professional indoor football team based in Highland Heights, Kentucky and were members of American Indoor Football that began play in the 2016 season. The Nightmare, who were nominally a replacement for the Northern Kentucky River Monsters (a team that had played in various indoor leagues during the early 2010s), played all their games on the road during the 2016 season. Following the 2016 season, the AIF ceased operations, and the Nightmare were left without a league. In September 2016, owner W. Leland Bennett III was listed as the owner of another proposed Northern Kentucky indoor football team in negotiations with joining the new Arena Developmental League, but were later removed from the league in November.

Final roster

Staff

Statistics and records

Season record

Head coaches' records

2016 season

Key

Regular season
All start times were local to home team

Standings

References

External links
American Indoor Football official website

 
2016 establishments in Kentucky
2016 disestablishments in Kentucky